The music of Vanuatu may refer to any kind of music played in the country of Vanuatu.

Traditional music 
Traditional music (known in Bislama as kastom singsing or kastom tanis) is still thriving in the rural areas of Vanuatu. Musical instruments consist mostly of idiophones: drums of various shape and size, slit gongs, as well as rattles, among others. In various regions, aerophones, such as conch shells, whistles or bamboo flutes, are (or used to be) played. Membranophones and chordophones were also found in some areas, but have fallen into disuse during colonial times.

The large slit gongs which symbolize Vanuatu belong to these traditional instruments; they were most often used as musical drums to accompany certain dances, but also sometimes – though seldom – as a ritual means of communication; although widespread throughout Vanuatu, they are used vertically only in central areas of the archipelago (mainly on Ambrym). So-called traditional music is actually a very general cover term encompassing a wide and complex variety of musical genres known by every local community – in a way very similar to the vague term classical music of Western societies.

String bands 
Another musical genre that has become widely popular during the 20th century in all areas of Vanuatu, is known as string band music. It combines guitars, ukulele, and popular songs.

Urban music 
More recently the music of Vanuatu, as an industry, grew rapidly in the 1990s. The early part of that decade saw bands like Huarere and Tropic Tempo forge a distinctly ni-Vanuatu modern musical identity, and more bands have followed in their footsteps, including XX-Squad and Vanessa Quai. Popular genres of commercial music, which are currently being played in town, include African new wave, Reggae, zouk music and reggaeton. African Zouk, Reggae and Reggaeton, a variation of hip-hop rapped in Spanish, played alongside its own distinctive beat, is especially played in the local nightclubs of Vanuatu with, mostly, an audience of Westerners and tourists. Reggae is also becoming the Nations favorite and the local upcoming reggae stars are not limited to Naio Band, Stan and The Earthforce band, Tujah, Smol Fyah and Metoxide!

References

Notes

Bibliography
.
 .

External links
Leweton string band's music Album
 Leweton string band's video clip